Usson is a commune in the Puy-de-Dôme department in Auvergne in central France.

History
Usson's castle, demolished under the order of the cardinal of Richelieu, was before, from 1585 to 1605 the residence of Marguerite de Valois (1553–1615), called The Queen Margot, first spouse (1572–1599) of the French king Henri IV.
According to Revel's drawing made in 15th century, the fortress must have been big (triple surrounding, 20 towers) as well as feared.  We clearly understand the Richelieu might have seen a threat for its central authority. The castle's moto, was: Garde le traître et la dent (Beware the traitor and the tooth). In other words, such impregnable fortress only had one threat to deal with : traitors or starvation.

See also
Communes of the Puy-de-Dôme department

References

Communes of Puy-de-Dôme
Plus Beaux Villages de France